Mount Prince is a prominent butte (640 m) marking the north end of Perry Range on the coast of Marie Byrd Land. The feature was discovered and photographed from aircraft of the United States Antarctic Service (USAS), 1939–41, and was mapped by United States Geological Survey (USGS) from surveys and air photos, 1959–65. Named by Advisory Committee on Antarctic Names (US-ACAN) for Joseph F. Prince, ADR2, U.S. Navy, Aviation Machinist's Mate with Squadron VXE-6 who participated in several Operation Deep Freeze operations and wintered over at Little America V (1956) and McMurdo Station (1966).

Mountains of Marie Byrd Land
Buttes of Antarctica